Roman Málek (born September 25, 1977) is a former Czech professional ice hockey goaltender who played in the Czech Extraliga, Russian Superleague, and Swedish Hockey League. He was selected by the Philadelphia Flyers in the 5th round (158th overall) of the 2001 NHL Entry Draft but did not play in America.

Málek played with HC Vítkovice in the Czech Extraliga during the 2010–11 season. He is now a Goalie Coach in Slavia Prague and runs Goalie Service Camps for young goalies.

He has recently build a training goalie net for his offsprings to practice during the coronavirus pandemic.

References

External links

1977 births
Czech ice hockey goaltenders
Philadelphia Flyers draft picks
HC Karlovy Vary players
HC Plzeň players
HC Slavia Praha players
HC Vítkovice players
Metallurg Magnitogorsk players
Modo Hockey players
Living people
Ice hockey people from Prague
Czech expatriate ice hockey players in Russia
Czech expatriate ice hockey players in Sweden